Dowagiac is a train station in Dowagiac, Michigan, served by Amtrak, the United States' railroad passenger system. The station was built by the Michigan Central Railroad in 1902, and added to the National Register of Historic Places in 1993.

It is served by Amtrak's  and  trains and was formerly a stop for the International Limited.  The Limited commenced service from Chicago to Toronto in 1982, and was discontinued in 2004.  It was a joint operation by Via Rail and Amtrak.

History

The Michigan Central Railroad built a set of tracks providing passenger service through Dowagiac in 1848. A new depot was constructed in the 1870s. The current station, replacing the 1870s station, is the third constructed by the Michigan Railroad in Dowagiac.  The architect for the station is not documented, but is almost certainly the firm of Spier and Rohns. The railway hired contractor M. J. Rogers of Detroit to supervise construction.  The building was completed in 1903, and has remained in use as a passenger station since that time. A restoration project took place in 1995.

Description
The depot is a single-story brick Tudor Revival structure trimmed with limestone.  The depot consists of two hip roof buildings, one for passengers and one for baggage, connected with a gable roof canopy supported by metal columns.  The passenger station has a square two-story tower projecting from the street side and a projecting octagonal ticket office on the track side.  The station is accessed through a port cochere and glassed-in entry porch. Hip roof dormers are placed on the roof, and rows of square head windows line the sides of both the passenger station and baggage depot.

References

External links

Dowagiac Amtrak Station (USA Rail Guide -- Train Web)
Dowagiac Michigan Central Depot (Michigan's Internet Railroad History Museum)

Amtrak stations in Michigan
Michigan Line
Railway stations in the United States opened in 1903
Railway stations on the National Register of Historic Places in Michigan
Michigan State Historic Sites
Transportation in Cass County, Michigan
National Register of Historic Places in Cass County, Michigan
Former Michigan Central Railroad stations